Central Park Stadium formerly Sittingbourne Stadium is a greyhound racing track, and former speedway track and football stadium located in Murston, Sittingbourne, Kent, England. Greyhound racing takes place every Friday evening in addition to their four SIS morning meetings.

Facilities
The stadium was built to a capacity of approximately 6000, with 2000 seats available in the Main Stand, two end terraces and a large covered terrace opposite the Main Stand. There are also four private suites, a trackside restaurant, three bars and a fast food cafeteria.

History
Sittingbourne FC played at the Bull Ground in the town centre until 1990 when they sold the site for £4.5 million and built a new state of the art stadium on the outskirts of the town named Central Park Stadium. However, overspending on the new ground caused the club financial difficulties and they were forced to sell the ground to the local council and lease it back.  The ground was eventually leased to a company that ran greyhound racing events, who allowed the football club to sign a seven-year lease (a requirement of the Southern League). The club found it hard to guarantee the availability of the stadium due to the racing, however, and agreed to start playing their games on part of the complex where they used to train. This was built in 2002 and named Bourne Park.

Speedway

In May 2013, National League speedway returned to the county of Kent, with the newly formed Kent Kings racing at the stadium. The racing was held until the end of the 2021 season.

Greyhound Racing

Competitions
Grand National
Kent Derby
Kent Silver Salver
WJ & JE Cearns Invitation
Springbok
Juvenile

Opening

The track was supposed to have opened during 1994 but following several trial sessions was put on hold due to problems surrounding the football club. These included debts of £1.1 million and a £680,000 repair to a structural design fault with the roof of the stadium.

Sittingbourne opened on Tuesday 3 October 1995, with a crowd 2,125; the new facilities included a track side restaurant, fast food outlets, three licensed bars and three private executive suites. The first ever race over 475 metres was won by Try My House for trainer Wayne Wilson. Wilson would also claim the first major win for the track when he won the 1995 Puppy Derby at Wimbledon Stadium with Corpo Election. The other trainers supplying runners on the opening night were Sonia Spiers, Derek Millen, Alison Ingram, Peter Galloway, Martin White, Ken Tester, Mick Mew & Tony Palmer. The General Manager was John Aitken and the Racing Manager was Paul Nevett.

History
Financial troubles surfaced again in 1996 and the track was forced to close and with no promoter available to run the stadium the future of the new venue was put into question. However, during 1996 Roger Cearns re-opened the stadium; Cearns was the grandson of W.J. 'Bill' Cearns the founder of Wimbledon Stadium way back in 1928. Cearns transformed the operation into a successful business and in the process negotiated a deal that brought the Trainers Championship to the track in 1998.

Cearns then introduced the Kent Derby as the tracks principal event and managed to secure a second Trainers Championship in 2000. Cheryl Miller & Maxine Locke joined the training ranks soon after and Jess Packer was brought in as Racing Manager. Cheryl Miller reached the 2002 English Greyhound Derby final with Windgap Java, a first for Sittingbourne; the fawn dog had won the Pall Mall Stakes earlier in the year. Another major event was introduced at the track called the Kent Silver Salver, revived after being shelved following the closure of Canterbury.  In 2003 Sittingbourne staged a third Trainers Championship within a six-year period and the track took over the running of the WJ Cearns Memorial) from Wimbledon. In 2006 the track agreed a deal with Betfair to stage 10 Sunday meetings that were screened on Eurosport.

Lenson Joker won the 2008 Greyhound of the Year and John Mullins won the 2011 TV Trophy on his home track with Knockies Hannah, the first time the event had been held at Sittingbourne. In 2012 the track was granted permission to host the original classic race for hurdlers the Grand National which moved from Wimbledon. It was a major coup for the track.

In 2017 following the closure of Wimbledon Stadium the track received two more high-profile competitions called the Springbok and Juvenile. The Springbok was inaugurated in 1937  and is the leading competition for novice hurdlers. The Juvenile was inaugurated in 1957 and is an invitation competition for the best six greyhounds who still have a puppy status.

In 2018 the stadium signed a deal with SIS to race every Monday, Tuesday, Wednesday and Thursday morning and every Friday evening. Following the closure of Towcester in 2018, trainer Patrick Janssens joined the track and later won the 2020 Trainer of the Year title.

In April 2021, promoter Roger Cearns announced that the stadium had been sold to the Arena Racing Company.

Track records

Current

Previous

References

External links
 Kent Kings official site

Greyhound racing venues in the United Kingdom
Sports venues in Kent
Defunct speedway venues in England
Sittingbourne
Sport in Sittingbourne